SpongeBob SquarePants is an American animated television series created by marine biologist and animator Stephen Hillenburg that premiered on Nickelodeon on May 1, 1999. The series is set in the fictional underwater city of Bikini Bottom, and centers on the adventures and endeavors of SpongeBob SquarePants, an over-optimistic sea sponge. Many of the ideas for the show originated in an unpublished, educational comic book titled The Intertidal Zone, which Hillenburg created in the mid-1980s. He began developing SpongeBob SquarePants into a television series in 1996 after the cancellation of Rocko's Modern Life, another Nickelodeon television series that Hillenburg previously directed.

 The thirteenth season consists of 26 episodes. The SpongeBob SquarePants Movie, a feature-length film, was released in theaters on November 19, 2004, and grossed over US$140 million worldwide. Atlantis SquarePantis, a television film guest starring David Bowie, debuted as part of the fifth season. In 2009, Nickelodeon celebrated the show's tenth anniversary with Square Roots: The Story of SpongeBob SquarePants and SpongeBob's Truth or Square. The SpongeBob Movie: Sponge Out of Water, a stand-alone sequel, was released in theaters on February 6, 2015, and grossed over US$324 million worldwide.

Episodes of SpongeBob SquarePants have been nominated for a variety of different awards, including 17 Annie Awards (with six wins), 17 Golden Reel Awards (with eight wins), 15 Emmy Awards (with one win), 19 Kids' Choice Awards (with 18 wins), and four BAFTA Children's Awards (with two wins). Several compilation DVDs have been released.

Series overview

Episodes

Season 1 (1999–2001)

The first season of SpongeBob SquarePants consists of 20 episodes (41 segments, since the first episode has three segments). This is the only season that used cel animation. The episodes are ordered according to Nickelodeon's packaging order, and not their original production or broadcast order.

Season 2 (2000–03)

The second season of SpongeBob SquarePants consists of 20 episodes (39 segments), which are ordered below according to Nickelodeon's packaging order, and not their original production or broadcast order.

Season 3 (2001–04)

The third season of SpongeBob SquarePants consists of 20 episodes (37 segments), which are ordered below according to Nickelodeon's packaging order, and not their original production or broadcast order.

Season 4 (2005–07)

The fourth season of SpongeBob SquarePants consists of 20 episodes (38 segments), which are ordered below according to Nickelodeon's packaging order, and not their original production or broadcast order.

Season 5 (2007–09)

The fifth season of SpongeBob SquarePants consists of 20 episodes (41 segments), which are ordered below according to Nickelodeon's packaging order, and not their original production or broadcast order.

Season 6 (2008–10)

The sixth season of SpongeBob SquarePants consists of 26 episodes (47 segments), which are ordered below according to Nickelodeon's packaging order, and not their original production or broadcast order.

Season 7 (2009–11)

The seventh season of SpongeBob SquarePants consists of 26 episodes (50 segments), which are ordered below according to Nickelodeon's packaging order, and not their original production or broadcast order.

Season 8 (2011–12)

The eighth season of SpongeBob SquarePants consists of 26 episodes (47 segments), which are ordered below according to Nickelodeon's packaging order, and not their original production or broadcast order.

Season 9 (2012–17)

The ninth season of SpongeBob SquarePants consists of 26 episodes (49 segments), which are ordered below according to Nickelodeon's packaging order, and not their original production or broadcast order.

Season 10 (2016–17)

The tenth season of SpongeBob SquarePants consists of 11 episodes (22 segments), which are ordered below according to Nickelodeon's packaging order, and not their original production or broadcast order. It is the shortest season, lacking the usual 26 episode length.

Season 11 (2017–18)

The eleventh season of SpongeBob SquarePants consists of 26 episodes (50 segments), which are ordered below according to Nickelodeon's packaging order, and not their original production or broadcast order.

Season 12 (2018–22)

The twelfth season of SpongeBob SquarePants consists of 26 episodes (48 segments), which are ordered according to Nickelodeon's packaging order, and not their original production or broadcast order. This was the last season that series creator, Stephen Hillenburg was involved in before his death from amyotrophic lateral sclerosis on November 26, 2018, at age 57.

Season 13 (2020–23)

The thirteenth season of SpongeBob SquarePants consists of 26 episodes, which are ordered below according to Nickelodeon's packaging order, and not their original production or broadcast order.

Films

Notes

References
}}

Works cited

External links

 
 
 SpongeBob SquarePants at the Big Cartoon DataBase

 
Episodes
Episodes 01
SpongeBob
SpongeBob
SpongeBob SquarePants